The Roof mansion is one of the twenty-eight mansions of the Chinese constellations.  It is one of the northern mansions of the Black Tortoise.

Asterisms

References

Chinese constellations